"Good Lovin'" is a song recorded by Canadian country music singer Jess Moskaluke for her debut studio album, Light Up the Night (2014). It was written by Laura Bell Bundy, Erin Enderlin, and Jerry Flowers. "Good Lovin'" was released October 15, 2013 as the album's lead single. The song was Moskaluke's first top 20 single on the Canada Country chart.

Promotion
Moskaluke uploaded a lyric video for the song to her official YouTube channel on November 4, 2013.

Accolades
"Good Lovin'" won the award for Song of the Year at the 2014 Saskatchewan Country Music Awards.

Charts

Release history

References

2013 songs
2013 singles
Jess Moskaluke songs
Songs written by Jerry Flowers
Songs written by Erin Enderlin